Napat Injaiuea, nicknamed Gun, is a Thai singer-songwriter, actor, writer and the winner of the sixth season of reality talent show, The Star 6.

Early life and education
Injaiuea was born Chanin Injaiuea (ชนินทร์ อินทร์ใจเอื้อ) on 23 October 1990 in Suphan Buri province, Thailand, as the middle child. He attended the Suankularb Wittayalai School, and graduated with a bachelor's degree from Kasetsart University.

Career
Injaiuea debuted after winning a Thai singing competition, The Star 6, whereupon he adopted the stage name "Naphat" (นภัทร). His entertainment career spans around music, acting, and hosting.

Filmography

Television

TV sitcoms

Television programs

Musicals

Discography

Studio albums

Other albums

Soundtracks

External links

Napat Injaiuea
Napat Injaiuea
Napat Injaiuea
Napat Injaiuea
1990 births
Living people